The Manhasset Viaduct (also known as the Manhasset Valley Bridge) is a railroad bridge located between the Village of Thomaston and the Hamlet of Manhasset, on Long Island, in the State of New York. It carries the Port Washington Branch of the Long Island Rail Road.

Description 
The bridge was completed in 1898, and opened on June 23 of that year, as part of the Port Washington Branch's extension from Great Neck to Port Washington. At an average height of 81 feet (24 Meters) above the water and measuring 679 feet (207 Meters) in length, the bridge is the highest on the entire LIRR network. In 1913, the remainder of the Port Washington Branch east of the former split with the former Whitestone Branch was electrified, and thus including the portion over this bridge. 

The bridge, which is of a steel stringer design, was built by the Cincinnati, Ohio-based King Bridge Company, as well as the Carnegie Steel Company. 

The Manhasset Viaduct is a significant and vital component of the Port Washington Branch's infrastructure, as it is what enables the line to traverse the Manhasset Valley; the extension to Port Washington required the construction of this crossing.

In addition to crossing Manhasset Bay, the bridge also goes over East Shore Road (on its west end) and Bayview Avenue (on its east end).

See also 
 Manhasset station
 Port Washington Branch
 History of the Long Island Railroad

References 

Manhasset, New York
Bridges in Nassau County, New York
Long Island Rail Road
Railroad bridges in New York (state)